Cosmochelys is an extinct genus of sea turtle from the Eocene of Africa. It was first named by Andrews in 1920, and contains one species, C. dolloi.

References

External links
 Cosmochelys at the Paleobiology Database
 Journal of Vertebrate Paleontology (subscription required to view) 2003–12. Retrieved on 2008-08-11

Eocene turtles
Dermochelyidae
Fossil taxa described in 1920
Paleogene reptiles of Africa
Prehistoric turtle genera
Extinct turtles
Monotypic prehistoric reptile genera